Yadira Geara Cury (born 1 February 1986) is a former tennis player from the Dominican Republic. She played for the Dominican Republic Fed Cup team in 2002 and 2003.

References

Living people
Sportspeople from Santo Domingo
Dominican Republic female tennis players
1986 births
20th-century Dominican Republic women
21st-century Dominican Republic women